County Buildings is a municipal facility at Martin Street in Stafford, Staffordshire. The building, which is the meeting place for Staffordshire County Council, is a Grade II* listed building.

History
In the 19th century the Shire Hall in Market Square became well established as the venue for judicial meetings and civic functions in the county. Following the implementation of the Local Government Act 1888, which established county councils in every county, there was a need to find offices and a meeting place for Staffordshire County Council. Council leaders decided to procure new county offices: the site they selected in Martin Street had previously been occupied by several a row of retail properties.

The new County Buildings, which were designed by Henry Hare in the Baroque revival style, were completed in 1895. The design involved an asymmetrical main frontage with fifteen bays facing onto the Martin Street; the central section of seven bays featured a doorway with an architrave and segmental pediment with mullioned windows on the first floor. The left hand section, which slightly projected forward, featured a window split by Ionic order columns while the right hand section, which also slightly projected forward, featured a venetian window. Internally, the principal room was the council chamber which featured plasterwork by Frederick Schenck as well as figures sculpted by William Aumonier.

In April 2009 the council announced plans for a new headquarters in Tipping Street: the new offices were designed by 3DReid, built by Volker Fitzpatrick at a cost of £38 million and completed in October 2011. The new offices were officially opened by the Countess of Wessex as "Staffordshire Place" in May 2013.

Following the departure of council officers and their departments to Staffordshire Place, much of the office space in County Buildings was converted into a series of private residences known as "Martin Street Mansions". However, the county council retained the main civic rooms and continued to hold full meetings of the county council in the council chamber. The civic rooms in County Buildings were also made available for weddings and civil partnerships.

See also
Grade II* listed buildings in Stafford (borough)
Listed buildings in Stafford (Central Area)

References

S
Grade II* listed buildings in Staffordshire
Government buildings completed in 1895